HMS Prince George was a  pre-dreadnought battleship launched in 1895. She was named after the future George V of the United Kingdom and was the fourth and final ship to bear that name. Commissioned in 1896, she initially served with the Channel Fleet until 1904. She was involved in a collision with her sister ship, and the resulting damage meant that much of the latter part of 1903 was spent being repaired. After a refit in 1904, she was assigned to the Atlantic Fleet and then from 1907, she was part of the Home Fleet. In 1912, she was assigned to the 7th Battle Squadron.

When World War I broke out Prince George, together with the rest of the squadron, was attached to the Channel Fleet during the early stages of the war. In early 1915, she was dispatched to the Mediterranean for service in the Dardanelles Campaign. She participated in bombardments of Turkish forts and supported the Allied operations at Gallipoli, including the evacuation from the peninsula late in 1915. She spent the remainder of the war back in the United Kingdom, initially as an accommodation ship before being converted to a depot ship for destroyers in 1918 and stationed at Scapa Flow. For this latter role, she was renamed Victorious II before reverting to her original name in 1919. Decommissioned in 1920, she was sold for scrapping to a German company but sank off the Netherlands during transit to Germany.

Design 

Her propulsion system consisted of two 3-cylinder triple-expansion steam engines powered by eight coal-fired, cylindrical fire-tube boilers. By 1907–1908, she was re-boilered with oil-fired models. The Majestics were considered good seaboats with an easy roll and good steamers, although they suffered from high fuel consumption. She had a crew of 672 officers and ratings.

Prince George was armed with a main battery of four BL  Mk VIII guns in twin-gun turrets, one forward and one aft. Prince George also carried a secondary battery of twelve QF  /40 guns. They were mounted in casemates in two gun decks amidships. She also carried sixteen QF 12-pounder guns and twelve QF 2-pounder guns for defence against torpedo boats. She was also equipped with five  torpedo tubes, four of which were submerged in the ship's hull, with the last in a deck-mounted launcher.

Prince George and the other ships of her class had 9 inches (229 mm) of Harvey steel in their belt armour, which allowed equal protection with less cost in weight compared to previous types of armour. This allowed Prince George and her sisters to have a deeper and lighter belt than previous battleships without any loss in protection.

Operational history

Pre-World War I 

Prince George was laid down at the Portsmouth Dockyard on 10 September 1894. She was launched less than a year later, on 22 August 1895, after which fitting-out work commenced. The ceremony was performed by the Duchess of York (later Queen Mary), in the presence of her husband Prince George, Duke of York (later King George V), for whom the ship was named. She was commissioned into the Royal Navy on 26 November 1896, to serve with the Channel Fleet. She was present at both the Fleet Review at Spithead for the Diamond Jubilee of Queen Victoria on 26 June 1897. Captain Arthur Barrow was appointed in command on 28 June 1899, and was succeeded by Captain Arthur Calvert Clarke in November 1901. She was present at the Coronation Fleet Review for King Edward VII on 16 August 1902, and the following month visited the Aegean Sea for combined manoeuvres with the Channel and Mediterranean fleets.

Prince George was in danger of sinking for several hours, but managed to make it to Ferrol, steering with her engines and with her sternwalk awash. After temporary repairs at Ferrol, she departed on 24 October 1903 for Portsmouth, where her repairs were completed.Prince George ended her Channel Fleet service in July 1904, and began a refit at Portsmouth. Upon its completion, she was commissioned into the reserve there on 3 January 1905. On 14 February 1905, she was commissioned for service with the Atlantic Fleet, which had been the Channel Fleet until a fleet reorganisation on 1 January 1905. On 3 March 1905 she collided with the German armoured cruiser  at Gibraltar without serious damage. On 17 July 1905, Prince George was transferred to the new Channel Fleet, ending this service on 4 March 1907 when she was paid off at Portsmouth.Prince George was recommissioned on 5 March 1907 to serve as the flagship of the Commander-in-Chief, Portsmouth Division of the new Home Fleet which had been organised in January 1907. On 5 December 1907 she collided with the armoured cruiser  at Portsmouth, sustaining significant damage to her deck plating and boat davits. She was relieved as flagship in February 1909, and from March to December she underwent a refit at Portsmouth, during which she had radio installed. Prince George was reduced to a nucleus crew and placed in the commissioned reserve in December 1910. She moved to Devonport in 1911. In June 1912, Prince George became part of the 7th Battle Squadron, 3rd Fleet.

 World War I 

Upon the outbreak of the First World War in August 1914, Prince George returned to full commission on 8 August, and briefly was the squadron's first flagship, until relieved in this role by the battleship  on 15 August. On 25 August, Prince George covered the passage of the Plymouth Marine Division to Ostend, Belgium, and in September she covered the movement of the British Expeditionary Force from England to France. Prince Georges Channel Fleet service ended in February 1915 when she transferred to the Dardanelles for service in the Dardanelles campaign as a "mine-bumper". She arrived at Tenedos on 1 March 1915, which would be her base until February 1916. She took part in attacks on Ottoman Turkish forts covering the Turkish Straits on 5 and 18 March. On 3 May, while firing on Turkish batteries, she took a 6-inch (152-mm) hit below the waterline, and returned to Malta for repairs.Prince George was back in action on 12 and 13 July, supporting French troops with gunfire support from off of Krithia and Achi Baba. On 18 and 19 December she covered the evacuation of Allied troops from Suvla Bay, and the evacuation from West Beach on 8 and 9 January 1916; she was hit by a torpedo off Cape Helles on 9 January, but it failed to explode and she suffered no damage. She was at Salonika in January and February. Prince George left the Mediterranean at the end of February and paid off at Chatham Dockyard in March to provide crews for antisubmarine vessels. She remained at Chatham in a care and maintenance status through February 1918, serving as an auxiliary sickbay and in other subsidiary duties, then served as an accommodation ship there from March 1916 to May 1918.

In May 1918, Prince George began a refit at Chatham for conversion to a destroyer depot ship. She was renamed Victorious II in September 1918, and emerged from refit in October 1918. She was then attached to repair ship (her sister ship and former battleship)  at Scapa Flow, where she served as a depot ship to destroyers of the Grand Fleet. She reverted to the name Prince George in February 1919, and in March transferred to Sheerness to serve as depot ship to destroyers based on the Medway. Prince George was placed on the disposal list at Sheerness on 21 February 1920, and was sold for scrapping to a British firm on 22 September 1921. She was resold to a German firm in December 1921, and departed for Germany for scrapping. During the voyage, Prince George'' was wrecked on 30 December 1921 off Camperduin, the Netherlands. She subsequently was stripped of valuable materials and left as a breakwater, remaining there to this day. In 2014 she was buried in sand as part of a beach expansion program. A marker rests above where the wreck lies.

Footnotes

Notes

Citations

References

Further reading

External links 

 battleships-cruisers.co.uk HMS Prince George
Photograph album of HMS Prince George in the Dardanelles, 1915 - 1916 held at Churchill Archives Centre

 

Majestic-class battleships
Ships built in Portsmouth
1895 ships
Victorian-era battleships of the United Kingdom
World War I battleships of the United Kingdom
Ships sunk as breakwaters